Tylney may refer to:

Earl Tylney, of Castlemaine in the County of Kerry, title in the Peerage of Ireland
Edmund Tylney (1536–1610), courtier, Master of the Revels to Queen Elizabeth and King James
Richard Child, 1st Earl Tylney (1680–1750), English Member of Parliament
Sir James Tylney-Long, 7th Baronet (1736–1794), English politician
Tylney-Long baronets, a title in the Baronetage of England
William Pole-Tylney-Long-Wellesley (disambiguation)

See also
Athelney
Teylingen
Tilney (disambiguation)
Tylanthes